Alférez FAP David Figueroa Fernandini Airport  is an airport serving Huánuco, Peru. It is the most important airport in the Huánuco Region and is operated by the civil government. It is currently served by 3 airlines, with all of them offering daily flights to Lima: ATSA, Star Perú and Wayraperú. Although there are no other regular scheduled services, the airport serves many charter and private flights.

The runway is in the valley of the Huallaga River, with high terrain in all quadrants. Runway length includes a  displaced threshold on the western end.

The Huanuco non-directional beacon (Ident: NUC) is located on the field.

Airlines and destinations

See also
Transport in Peru
List of airports in Peru

References

External links
OurAirports - Huánuco
SkyVector Aeronautical Charts
OpenStreetMap - Huánuco

Airports in Peru
Buildings and structures in Huánuco Region